Bournville Rugby Football Club is an English rugby union team based in Birmingham. The club has recently moved to new facilities at Avery Fields, 79 Sandon Road, Edgbaston, Birmingham B17 8DT. The club operates three senior men's teams, a women's side, a veterans' team and a full range of junior teams. The first XV currently play in the fourth tier of the English rugby union system, having been promoted from the Midlands Premier in season 2019–20.

History
Bournville Rugby Club was formed in 1909 as the rugby section of Bournville Athletic Club. Recent years has seen the club make progress up the rugby union hierarchy after struggling during the early years of the English rugby union leagues system. Recent seasons has seen the club move from level ten to level four following elevation into the lowest level of national rugby in 2012 when they won promotion to National 3 Midlands via a promotion play-off, after a second-placed finish in Midlands 1 West.

Current standings

Honours
 North Midlands 4 champions: 1991–92
 North Midlands Shield winners: 2008–09
 Midlands 1 (east v west) promotion play-off winners (2): 2011–12, 2016–17
 North Midlands Cup winners (2): 2012–13, 2016–17
 Midlands 5 West (North) champions: 2006–07
 Midlands Premier champions: 2019–20

Notable former players
  Şerban Ghica

References

External links
 Official club website

1909 establishments in England
English rugby union teams
Rugby clubs established in 1909
Sport in Birmingham, West Midlands